The 1966–67 Shell Shield season was the second edition of what is now the Regional Four Day Competition, the domestic first-class cricket competition for the countries of the West Indies Cricket Board (WICB). The tournament was sponsored by Royal Dutch Shell, with matches played from 8 February to 3 April 1967.

Six teams contested the tournament – Barbados, British Guiana, Jamaica, the Leeward Islands, Trinidad and Tobago, and the Windward Islands. However, the Leeward and Windward Islands both played fewer matches than the other teams, and the results from their matches did not count towards the title. For a second season running, Barbados were undefeated, winning three matches and drawing the other to claim a second consecutive title. Barbadian batsman Peter Lashley led the tournament in runs, while his teammate Rawle Brancker and Jamaican bowler Rudolph Cohen led the tournament in wickets.

Teams

Points table

Key

 W – Outright win (12 points)
 L – Outright loss (0 points)
 LWF – Loss, but won first innings (4 points)

 DWF – Drawn, but won first innings (6 points)
 DLF – Drawn, and lost first innings (2 points)
 P – Overall points

Fixtures

Statistics

Most runs
The top five run-scorers are included in this table, listed by runs scored and then by batting average.

Most wickets

The top five wicket-takers are listed in this table, listed by wickets taken and then by bowling average.

References

West Indian cricket seasons from 1945–46 to 1969–70
Domestic cricket competitions in 1966–67
1967 in West Indian cricket
Regional Four Day Competition seasons